Lalramluaha Hmar (born 18 August 1990 in Aizawl, Mizoram) is an Indian footballer.

Career
Born in Aizawl, Mizoram, Luaha is a product of the famed Tata Football Academy in Jamshedpur, Jharkhand where he graduated from in 2008.

Shillong Lajong
In the summer of 2011 Luaha signed with newly promoted side Shillong Lajong F.C. in the I-League. He then scored his first professional goal of his career against Pailan Arrows in the I-League on 19 November 2011.

Pune FC
Lalram Luaha signed with Pune for the 2014-15 I-League season.

Career statistics

Club

References

External links 
 Libero Sports Profile

Indian footballers
1990 births
Living people
People from Aizawl
Shillong Lajong FC players
I-League players
Footballers from Mizoram
India youth international footballers
Association football midfielders